Pine Lake Park is a park in the southwest corner of San Francisco, California which encompasses Pine Lake.

History 
Following their move from Maine to San Francisco in 1847, the Greene family purchased a large property which included Stern Grove and Pine Lake. In 1887, a lawsuit forced the family to give up most of the property and allowed them to retain only the portion which today  comprises the park and adjacent Sigmund Stern Recreation Grove. The family planted the eucalyptus trees that continue to surround the lake.

The land and lake was purchased by the City of San Francisco in the five years following the opening of the adjoining Sigmund Stern Recreation Grove in 1932.

Geography 
Pine Lark Park is located in the southwest corner of San Francisco and occupies . The park encompasses Pine Lake and is adjacent to Sigmund Stern Recreation Grove.

Ecology 
Migratory birds along the Pacific Flyway stop to feed, rest, or inhabit the surrounding area.

Features 
A trail encircles the lake and connects to a larger trail network through Stern Grove and a segment of the Bay Area Ridge Trail.

The park includes a dog play area.

Operations 
The park is operated by the San Francisco Recreation and Parks Department. It is open all year from 6am to 10pm.

See also 

Parks in San Francisco

References

External links

 

Parks in San Francisco